Gressåmoen National Park is a former national park which was located within the municipality of Snåsa in Trøndelag county, Norway. The  Gressåmoen National Park was created in 1970 and it existed until 2004 when it was incorporated into Blåfjella–Skjækerfjella National Park.

Former national parks of Norway
Protected areas of Trøndelag
Protected areas established in 1970
Protected areas disestablished in 2004
1970 establishments in Norway